Maria Marten was a murder victim in Suffolk, England.

Maria Marten may also refer to:

 Maria Marten, or the Mystery of the Red Barn a 1913 silent British film directed by Maurice Elvey
 Maria Marten (1928 film), a silent British film directed by Walter West
 Maria Marten, or The Murder in the Red Barn, a 1935 film starring Tod Slaughter

See also
Maria Martin (disambiguation)